Redcort Software is an American software company that develops time and attendance software for both Apple Macintosh and Microsoft Windows computers. Redcort Software is headquartered in Fresno, California, in the middle of California's central San Joaquin Valley.

History 
In late 1997, Redcort Development (then a regional technology consulting firm) launched the redcort.com web site.

Products 
Virtual TimeClock is employee time clock software that enables businesses to track employee time and attendance, simplify payroll, manage labor costs, and track attendance compliance. It is a software alternative to mechanical employee time clocks and paper time card systems.

Recognition 
Redcort Software's products are routinely mentioned by Apple Inc. in their Apple Business Profiles, and reviewed in leading industry computer magazines like MacLife, Macworld, and CPA Technology Advisor.

See also 
Time tracking software
Comparison of time tracking software
Time clock
Timesheet
Time and attendance

External links 
 Redcort Software

References 

Business software
Business software companies
Software companies established in 1997
Software companies based in California
Software companies of the United States